Multan Express is a passenger train operated daily by Pakistan Railways between Multan and Lahore.

Route 
 Multan Cantonment–Lahore Junction via Karachi–Peshawar Railway Line

Station stops

Equipment 
The train offers economy accommodation as well as Parlor car and Business Class.

References 

Named passenger trains of Pakistan
Passenger trains in Pakistan
Transport in Multan
Rail transport in Punjab, Pakistan